Alcove Canyon is a valley in Apache County in the U.S. state of Arizona. The valley lies southwest of the Carrizo Mountains and extends to Walker Creek.

Alcove Canyon (or Alcove Creek) was so named due to the presence of erosional alcoves in the rock banks along its course.

References

Landforms of Apache County, Arizona
Valleys of Arizona